Robert Lynn Ivie (born July 29, 1945, in Medford, Oregon) is an American academic known for his works on American public rhetoric concerning war and terrorism.

Education and career
Ivie obtained a Ph.D. in rhetoric and communication in 1972 from Washington State University. He taught at Gonzaga University from 1972-1974, at Idaho State University from 1974-1975, at Washington State University from 1975-1986 (where he was briefly chair of the communication department in 1983) and at Texas A&M University from 1986-1993. In 1993, he came to Indiana University where he was a professor of Rhetoric and Public Culture in the Department of Communication and Culture at Indiana University until he retired in May 2013.

Books
Ivie is the author or co-author of books including
Congress Declares War: Rhetoric, Leadership, and Partisanship in the Early Republic (with Ronald L. Hatzenbuehler, Kent State University Press, 1983)
Cold War Rhetoric: Strategy, Metaphor, and Ideology (with Martin J. Medhurst, Philip Wander, and Robert L. Scott, Greenwood, 1990; 2nd ed., Michigan State University Press, 1997)
Democracy and America's War on Terror (University of Alabama Press, 2005)
Dissent From War (Kumarian Press, 2007)
Hunt the Devil: A Demonology of US War Culture (with Oscar Giner, University of Alabama Press, 2015)

References

Living people
1945 births
People from Medford, Oregon
Washington State University alumni
Gonzaga University faculty
University of Idaho faculty
Indiana University faculty
Texas A&M University faculty
Washington State University faculty
Idaho State University faculty